Adam Zagajewski (21 June 1945 – 21 March 2021) was a Polish poet, novelist, translator, and essayist. He was awarded the 2004 Neustadt International Prize for Literature, the 2016 Griffin Poetry Prize Lifetime Recognition Award, the 2017 Princess of Asturias Award for Literature and the 2018 Golden Wreath of Poetry at the Struga Poetry Evenings. He was considered a leading poet of the Generation of '68, or Polish New Wave (Polish: Nowa fala), and one of Poland's most prominent contemporary poets.

Biography 
Adam Zagajewski was born in 1945 in Lwów (now Lviv, Ukraine). His father was Tadeusz Zagajewski and his mother was Ludwika Zagajewska, née Turska. The Zagajewski family was expelled from Lwów to central Poland the same year as part of Soviet post-World War II policy. They moved to the city of Gliwice where he graduated from Andrzej Strug V High School (V Liceum Ogólnokształcące im. Andrzeja Struga). Subsequently, he studied psychology and philosophy at the Jagiellonian University in Kraków. He later taught philosophy at the AGH University of Science and Technology. In 1967, he made his poetic debut with Music, a poem published in Życie Literackie magazine. He published his works as well as reviews in such magazines as Odra (1969–1976) and Twórczość (1969, 1971–1973). During this time, he became involved in the New Wave (Nowa fala) literary movement also known as the Generation of '68'. The aim of the group was "standing up against the falsifications of reality and the appropriation of language by communist ideology and propaganda". After signing the Letter of 59 his works were banned by communist authorities in Poland. In 1978, he was one of the founders and first lecturers of the Scientific Training Association. In 1982, he emigrated to Paris, but in 2002 he returned to Poland together with his wife Maja Wodecka, and resided in Kraków. He was a member of the Polish Writers' Association.

His literary works have received international recognition and have been translated into many languages. Joachim T. Baer, a reviewer from World Literature Today pointed out that the recurring themes in Zagajewski's poetry include "the night, dreams, history and time, infinity and eternity, silence and death." Colm Tóibín notes that in his best poems "he has succeeded in making the space of the imagination connect with experience; things seen and heard and remembered in all their limits and sorrow and relished joy have the same power for him as things conjured." American poet Robert Pinsky observes that Zagajewski's poems are "about the presence of the past in ordinary life: history not as a chronicle of the dead … but as an immense, sometimes subtle force inhering in what people see and feel every day – and in the ways we see and feel". His poem "Try To Praise The Mutilated World" became famous when it was printed in The New Yorker shortly after the September 11 attacks.

Zagajewski used to teach poetry workshops as a visiting lecturer at the School of Literature and Arts at the Jagiellonian University in Kraków as well as a creative writing course at the University of Houston in the United States. He was a faculty member at the University of Chicago and a member of its Committee on Social Thought. He taught two classes, one of which is on fellow Polish poet Czeslaw Milosz. Commenting on the occasion of his death, Olga Tokarczuk remarked that he was an appreciated teacher of poetry.

Zagajewski died on 21 March 2021 at the age of 75 in Krakow.

Awards 
He was awarded the Bronze Cross of Merit, and twice received the Officer's Cross of the Order of Polonia Restituta. In 1992, he received a Guggenheim Fellowship. He won the 2004 Neustadt International Prize for Literature, considered a forerunner to the Nobel Prize in Literature, and is the second Polish writer to be awarded, after Czeslaw Milosz.
In 2015 he received the Heinrich Mann Prize. In May 2016 he was awarded the Dr. Leopold Lucas Prize of the University of Tübingen. In 2017 he was awarded The Princess of Asturias Award, "one of the most important awards in the Spanish-speaking world." In 2018 his collection of essays, Poezja dla początkujących (Poetry for Beginners), was nominated for the Nike Award, Poland's top literary honor. In 2019, Zagajewski was awarded Pour le Mérite for Sciences and Arts. In his lifetime, he was frequently mentioned as a potential Nobel Prize laureate.

Bibliography

Collections

Poetry 
Komunikat. Kraków, 1972. 
Sklepy mięsne. Kraków, 1975. 
List. Oda do wielkości. Paris, 1983. 
Jechać do Lwowa. London, 1985. 
Plótno. Paris, 1990. 
Ziemia ognista. Poznan, 1994. 
Trzej aniołowie / Three Angels. Kraków, 1998 (bilingual edition of selected poems). 
Pragnienie. Kraków, 1999. 
Powrót. Kraków, 2003. 
Anteny. Kraków, 2005. 
Unseen Hand (Niewidzialna reka). Kraków, 2009. 
Wiersze wybrane. Kraków, 2010. 
Asymetria. Kraków, 2014. 
Lotnisko w Amsterdamie / Airport in Amsterdam. Kraków, 2016 (bilingual edition of selected poems). 
Prawdziwe życie. Kraków, 2019.

Prose 
Ciepło, zimno. Warszawa, 1975. 
Słuch absolutny. Kraków, 1979. 
Cienka kreska. Kraków, 1983.

Essays 
Świat nieprzedstawiony. Kraków, 1974. 
Drugi oddech. Kraków, 1978. 
Solidarność i samotność. "Zeszyty literackie", 1986. 
Dwa miasta. Paryż-Kraków, 1991. 
Another Beauty (W cudzym pięknie). Poznań, 1998. 
Obrona żarliwosci. Kraków, 2002. 
Poeta rozmawia z filozofem. Warszawa, 2007. 
Lekka przesada. Kraków, 2011. 
Poezja dla początkujących. Warszawa, 2017. 
Substancja nieuporządkowana. Kraków, 2019.

Books in English translation

Poetry 
Tremor Translator Renata Gorczynski, Collins Harvill, 1987 
Canvas Translators Renata Gorczynski, Benjamin Ivry, C. K. Williams, Farrar, Straus and Giroux, 1994, 

Selected Poems, Translator Clare Cavanagh, Faber & Faber, 2004, 

Unseen Hand: Poems (2011) 
Asymmetry: Poems. Farrar, Straus and Giroux. 20 November 2018. .

Essays 
Solidarity, Solitude, Ecco Press, 1990, 

Slight Exaggeration: An Essay. Trans. Clare Cavanagh. Farrar, Straus and Giroux. 4 April 2017. .

Edited 
Polish Writers on Writing (Trinity University Press, 2007)

Critical studies and reviews 

.

See also 
List of Polish poets
Polish literature

References

External links 

Profile and poems by Adam Zagajewski at PoetryFoundation.org
Poems by Adam Zagajewski at Samizdat
Profile and poems by Adam Zagjewski at Poets.org
Adam Zagajewski at culture.pl
Kannada translations of 5 Adam Zagajewski poems by S. Jayasrinivasa Rao at https://avadhimag.in
Profile at Poetry International
Interview with Adam Zagagjewski in Barcelona Metropolis Magazine, Autumn, 2009
Recorded at the Lensic Theater in Santa Fe, New Mexico on 1 May 2002. (Audio, 70 mins)

1945 births
2021 deaths
20th-century essayists
20th-century Polish male writers
20th-century Polish novelists
20th-century Polish poets
21st-century essayists
21st-century Polish male writers
21st-century Polish novelists
21st-century Polish poets
Artist authors
Heinrich Mann Prize winners
Male essayists
The New Yorker people
Officers of the Order of Polonia Restituta
Polish essayists
Polish male novelists
Polish male poets
Polish poets
Polish translators
Recipients of the Bronze Cross of Merit (Poland)
Recipients of the Legion of Honour
Recipients of the Pour le Mérite (civil class)
Struga Poetry Evenings Golden Wreath laureates
University of Chicago faculty
University of Houston faculty
Writers from Lviv
People associated with the magazine "Kultura"